Christodoulos Taramountas (2 May 1957 – 8 November 2022) was a Cypriot lawyer and politician. A member of the Democratic Rally, European Democracy, and the European Party, he served in the House of Representatives from 2001 to 2006.

Taramountas died on 8 November 2022, at the age of 65.

References

1957 births
2022 deaths
Cypriot lawyers
Democratic Rally politicians
Members of the House of Representatives (Cyprus)
People from Kyrenia District